Goose Creek is a river in the Hudson Bay drainage basin in Northern Manitoba, Canada. It runs from an unnamed lake to the Nelson River, which it enters as a left tributary. The river flows under the Hudson Bay Railway (passed by the Via Rail Winnipeg – Churchill train), between the settlements of Weir River to the north and Charlebois to the south, close to its source; and under Manitoba Provincial Road 290 just before its mouth.

See also
List of rivers of Manitoba

References

Rivers of Northern Manitoba
Tributaries of Hudson Bay